Verkhniachka – a small village (selo) in the Stryi Raion, Lviv Oblast (province) of Western Ukraine (name to year 1954 - ). It belongs to Kozova rural hromada, one of the hromadas of Ukraine. 
Population of the village is about 939 people and Local government is administered by Verkhniachkivska village council.

Geography 
It is at a distance  from the Highway M06 (Ukraine).
Uzhhorod.
Stryi River originates on the outskirts of the village.

History and Attractions  
The first written record of the village dates from 1730 and its first name - Vyzliv.

In the village is an architectural monument of local importance of Stryi Raion. It is a wooden Church of Annunciation Virgin (1832) 

Until 18 July 2020, Verkhniachka belonged to Skole Raion. The raion was abolished in July 2020 as part of the administrative reform of Ukraine, which reduced the number of raions of Lviv Oblast to seven. The area of Skole Raion was merged into Stryi Raion.

References

External links 
  weather.in.ua/ Verkhniachka
 Верхнячка/Церква Благовіщення Пр. Богородиці 1832

Literature 
 Історія міст і сіл УРСР : Львівська область, Сколівський район, Верхня́чка. – К. : ГРУРЕ, 1968 р. Page 715 

Villages in Stryi Raion